Coins for the dead is a form of respect for the dead or bereavement. The practice began in classical antiquity when people believed the dead needed coins to pay a ferryman to cross the river Styx. In modern times the practice has been observed in the United States and Canada: visitors leave coins on the gravestones of former military personnel.

History

Ancient practice

Cemetery visitors began the practice of leaving coins for the dead in ancient Greece and ancient Rome. It was believed that when people died, they needed coins to pay Charon to cross the river Styx. It was believed that without coins, the dead would not be able to cross, and they would therefore live on the banks of the Styx river for 100 years. Ancient Egyptians followed the practice of burying people with riches that they might need in the next life. Greeks were also known to put a coin known as Charon's obol in the mouths of deceased people.

In the example of Jewish bereavement, there is archeological evidence to suggest that Jewish people placed coins over the eyes of the dead.

Modern practice
In modern times the practice of leaving coins for the dead has been primarily for the military graves. The practice of leaving coins at military personnel grave markers is primarily both American and Canadian tradition. It is seen as a way to show respect for the person's sacrifice. Each denomination of American and Canadian coins signifies the level of relationship the visitor had with the dead.

Penny means a person visited.
Nickel means the visitor went to bootcamp with the decedent.
Dime means the visitor served with the deceased.
Quarter means the visitor was present when the decedent was killed.

Some large cemeteries discourage the practice of leaving coins: Barbara Lewandowski, a spokesperson for Arlington National Cemetery, has asked visitors not to leave coins, because they cause injuries during grass cutting. She said leaving coins at the military cemetery was very common.

See also
Chinese burial money
Death and culture
List of ways people honor the dead
Visitation stones

References

Social history of the United States
Funerals in the United States
Social history of Canada
Funerals in Canada
Trinkets left at Graves
Death in Greek mythology
Death customs
Roman mythology
Coins